Gerd Briese (25 December 1897 – August 1957) was a German stage and film actor.

Briese's film career began in 1924, and he late worked as a stage actor and director. He was killed in a traffic accident in Berlin in 1957, aged 59.

Selected filmography
 Rosenmontag (1924)
 Reveille: The Great Awakening (1925)
 In the Valleys of the Southern Rhine (1925)
 Accommodations for Marriage (1926)
 The Sea Cadet (1926)
 The Flames Lie (1926)
 The Pirates of the Baltic Sea (1926)
 The Flames Lie (1926)
 U-9 Weddigen (1927)
 Linden Lady on the Rhine (1927)
 Forbidden Love (1927)
 Radio Magic (1927)
 Lützow's Wild Hunt (1927)
 A Day of Roses in August (1927)
 I Stand in the Dark Midnight (1927)
 Fair Game (1928)
 Sex in Chains (1928)
 The Lady from Argentina (1928)
 Roses Bloom on the Moorland (1929)
 Perjury (1929)
 The Customs Judge (1929)

Bibliography
 Kester, Bernadette. Film Front Weimar: Representations of the First World War in German films of the Weimar Period (1919-1933). Amsterdam University Press, 2003.

External links

1897 births
1957 deaths
German male film actors
German male silent film actors
People from Toruń
People from West Prussia
20th-century German male actors
Road incident deaths in Germany